Tyrone Christopher Legette (born February 15, 1970) is a former professional American football cornerback in the National Football League (NFL). He played seven seasons for the New Orleans Saints, the Tampa Bay Buccaneers, and the San Francisco 49ers.

1970 births
Living people
Players of American football from Columbia, South Carolina
American football cornerbacks
Nebraska Cornhuskers football players
New Orleans Saints players
Tampa Bay Buccaneers players
San Francisco 49ers players